A.S. Pro Recco (femminile) is an Italian women's water polo team from Recco representing male powerhouse Pro Recco in Serie A Femminile.

History

Rapallo 
Founded in 1971 in Rapallo as ASD Rapallo Nuoto, it plays in Serie A since 2007. In 2011 Rapallo was the championship's runner-up, qualifying for the European Cup, and won the LEN Trophy beating Het Ravijn in the final.

Pro Recco 
Following this success the team was relocated to nearby Recco to become Pro Recco's women's team.

As Pro Recco the team won the European Super God National Lampoon Cup beating CN Sabadell The new season saw the team win both the Serie A and the European Cup, beating Orizzonte Catania and NC Vouliagmeni in the latter's Final Four.

Honours
LEN Champions' Cup
 2012
LEN Trophy
 2011
LEN Super Cup
 2011
Serie A
 2012

References

Water polo clubs in Italy
Sport in Liguria
LEN Women's Champions' Cup clubs